Fairly Odd Coaster is a roller coaster at Nickelodeon Universe in the Mall of America near Minneapolis, Minnesota.

Fairly Odd Coaster may also refer to:
Fairly Odd Coaster (Carowinds), now the Woodstock Express at Carowinds in Charlotte, North Carolina
Fairly Odd Coaster (Kings Island), now the Woodstock Express at Kings Island near Cincinnati, Ohio